Choudwar Cuttack is a Vidhan Sabha constituency of Cuttack district, Odisha, India.

This constituency includes Choudwar,  19 wards of Cuttack, Charibatia (C.T), Choudwar (O.G), and 4 Gram panchayats (Nakhara, Kayalpada, Indranipatna and Agrahat) Tangi-Choudwar block.

Elected Members

Elected member from the Choudwar Cuttack constituency is:

 2014: (93): Pravat Biswal (BJD)

Choudwar constituency
13 Odisha Legislative Assembly elections were held between 1961 and 2014.
Elected members from the Choudwar constituency are:
 2009: (93): Pravat Biswal (BJD)
 2004: (45): Dharmananda Behera (BJD)
 2000: (45): Bidhu Bhusan Praharaj  (Independent)
 1995: (45): Kanhu Charan Lenka (Congress)
 1990: (45): Raj Kishore Ram (Janata Dal)
 1985: (45): Rasananda Sahu (Congress)
 1980: (45): Kanhu Charan Lenka (Congress-I)
 1977: (45): Raj Kishore Ram (Janata Party)
 1974: (45): Kanhu Charan Lenka (Congress)
 1971: (40): Kanhu Charan Lenka (Congress)
 1967: (42): Akulananda Behera (PSP)
 1961: (100): Biju Patnaik (Congress)

2019 Election Result

2014 Election Result

2009 Election Results
In 2009 election, Biju Janata Dal candidate Pravat Ranjan Biswal defeated Independent candidate Deepak Kumar Barik by a margin of 32,777 votes.

Notes

References

Assembly constituencies of Odisha
Politics of Cuttack district